Stamford Town Center is an urban shopping mall located in Downtown Stamford, Connecticut. The  mall is the eighth largest in Connecticut, with space for about 130 stores and restaurants. The mall's two anchors are a  Macy's and a Barnes and Noble. An  Todd English Food Hall is scheduled to open by 2024.

History

Construction 
Built by F.D. Rich Co and Taubman Centers, Stamford Town Center opened in 1982 as part of an urban renewal project and had been the location of tenement structures that once lined Greyrock Place, the street which is its primary address.

The mall was a significant part of Stamford's urban renewal efforts, and thus its construction was not without controversy. Upon the mall's opening, the city of Stamford reoriented nearby Bedford Street and Summer Street to be one-way, in order to make the mall more accessible via car, a move which harmed surrounding businesses. An opinion piece in the New York Times lamented the destruction of once lively housing complexes which hosted lower-income residences, which was done to make way for the mall.

Launch and success 
The mall launched with two anchors:  Macy's and J.C. Penney. Saks Fifth Avenue opened its store in the mall on March 12, 1983, and served as the mall's third anchor. From its opening, the mall was very popular and drew shoppers and tourists from as far as the New York City boroughs and even internationally, and was considered "one of the country's most successful malls" by the 1990s, despite stiff nearby competition. In July 1994, it was announced the mall's J.C. Penney would move out, and would be replaced by a Filene's.

2000s redevelopment 
In May 2006, the southern portion of the mall, along Tresser Boulevard, was demolished and redeveloped. The redevelopment of the former Filene's anchor emphasized being more pedestrian-friendly, and improving the nearby better streetscape. This portion of the mall, which included Filene's, was replaced with space for six new restaurants, and Connecticut's largest Barnes & Noble, the latter of which opened in 2008.

The initial opening of the Plaza (which included Barnes & Noble, H&M, California Pizza Kitchen, Così, Kona Grill, and P.F. Chang's) occurred on November 1, 2007. Mitchell's Fish Market opened on December 8, 2007, closed in 2014, while the Capital Grille opened on February 25, 2008. Famous Dave's Bar-B-Que had planned to open in this new space, but pulled out of the project.

Layout and design 
The mall's design has been criticized for not being pedestrian-friendly, something that the mall's developers sought to address in a redevelopment during the mid-2000s.

Anchors 
 Macy's – opened in 1982
 Barnes and Noble – opened in 2008

Former anchors 
 JCPenney – opened in 1982, closed in 1994
 Filene's – opened in 1994, closed in 2005, demolished in 2006
 Saks Fifth Avenue – opened in 1983, closed in 2014, reopened as Saks Fifth Avenue OFF 5TH in 2015
Saks Fifth Avenue OFF 5TH – opened in 2015, closed in 2021

Gallery

References

External links 
 
 

Buildings and structures in Stamford, Connecticut
Shopping malls in Connecticut
Shopping malls established in 1982
Taubman Centers
Tourist attractions in Stamford, Connecticut
Economy of Stamford, Connecticut
Shopping malls in the New York metropolitan area
1982 establishments in Connecticut